The Accademia degli Incogniti (Academy of the Unknowns), also called the Loredanian Academy, was a learned society of freethinking intellectuals, mainly noblemen, that significantly influenced the cultural and political life of mid-17th century Venice. The society was founded in 1630 by Giovanni Francesco Loredan and Guido Casoni, and derived its basic Aristotelian philosophy from Cesare Cremonini, a Peripatetic who was a professor of philosophy at the University of Padua. The society included historians, poets, and librettists. 

According to historian Ellen Rosand, the academy, in keeping with its name, usually operated behind the scenes. Members often wrote in secret language and frequently published their works anonymously. The Accademia degli Incogniti was particularly active in the promotion of musical theater in Venice from the 1630s onward, founding its own theater, the Teatro Novissimo, which flourished briefly between 1641 and 1645.  In their librettos for musical dramas, the iconoclastic intellectuals of the academy set a tone that was "[often] shockingly frank and frequently amoral". Among these  librettists were Giacomo Badoaro, who wrote Il ritorno d'Ulisse in patria for Claudio Monteverdi, and Giovanni Francesco Busenello, who provided Monteverdi with the libretto for the composer's final and arguably greatest operatic work, L'incoronazione di Poppea.  
Although the academy is often depicted as a group of "sceptical libertines extolling a peculiarly Venetian brand of (im)morality", Loredan was a respected senator of the Venetian Republic; other members likewise served the Republic as senators or councilors, and the academy remained an unofficial center of political power for several decades. Its influence began to wane in the late 1650s, and by 1661, the academy had ceased to meet.

References

Sources

1630 establishments in the Republic of Venice
Freethought organizations
Learned societies of Italy
Venetian Renaissance
1630 establishments in Italy